Jean-Pierre Samazeuilh, best known as Jean Samazeuilh (17 January 1891, Bordeaux – 13 April 1965, Mérignac), was a right-handed tennis player competing for France.

Samazeuilh reached three singles finals at the Amateur French Championships, winning in 1921 over André Gobert. Samazeuilh also won the doubles title at the tournament in 1923, partnering François Blanchy. He also competed at the 1920 Summer Olympics.

References

External links
 
 
 

French Championships (tennis) champions
French male tennis players
Tennis players from Bordeaux
1891 births
1965 deaths
Olympic tennis players of France
Tennis players at the 1920 Summer Olympics